Norrhult-Klavreström is a bimunicipal locality situated in Uppvidinge Municipality in Kronoberg County, Sweden with 1,215 inhabitants in 2010.

References 

Populated places in Kronoberg County
Populated places in Uppvidinge Municipality
Populated places in Växjö Municipality
Värend